Ian Johnson (born July 27, 1962) is a Canadian-born American writer and independent scholar known for his long-time reporting and a series of books on China and Germany. His Chinese name is Zhang Yan (張彦). Johnson writes regularly for The New York Review of Books and The New York Times, and The Wall Street Journal.

Johnson won the 2001 Pulitzer Prize for his coverage in the Wall St. Journal of the persecution of Falun Gong practitioners in China. His reporting from China was also honored in 2001 by the Overseas Press Club and the Society of Professional Journalists. In 2017 he won Stanford University's Shorenstein Prize for his body of work covering Asia. In 2019 he won the American Academy of Religion's "best in-depth newswriting" award.

In 2020, Johnson's journalist visa was canceled amid US-China tensions over trade and the COVID-19 epidemic, and he left China. He currently lives in New York, where he is Stephen A. Schwarzman senior fellow for China studies at the Council on Foreign Relations.

Life and work
Born in Montreal, Quebec, Canada, Johnson is a naturalized United States citizen who lived in Beijing, China, for more than twenty years. He attended Chamberlain High School in Tampa, Florida. He first visited China as a student in 1984 and later studied Chinese in Taiwan. From 1994 to 1997 he worked in Beijing for The Baltimore Sun and from 1997 to 2001 for The Wall Street Journal. After working in Berlin, Germany, for nearly eight years he returned to China in 2009.

In 2004, Johnson published Wild Grass: Three Stories of Change in Modern China (Pantheon) on grassroots efforts to form civil society. It was later released in paperback and has been translated into several languages.

In 2010, Johnson published A Mosque in Munich, a book about the rise of the Muslim Brotherhood in Europe. He conducted research on the book while on a Nieman fellowship at Harvard University.

In 2017, he published The Souls of China: The Return of Religion After Mao about China's search for meaning and values. It included a 100-page profile of Early Rain Reformed Church in Chengdu and its pastor Wang Yi (pastor) who was arrested in 2018 for incitement to subvert state power. It also included one of the last in-depth interviews with the popular Chinese spiritual leader Nan Huai-Chin as well as research on Xi Jinping's support for traditional religions, especially Buddhism, when he was head of Zhengding County in the 1980s. The Souls of China was voted one of the best books of the year by The Economist and The Christian Science Monitor.

He has published chapters in three other books: The Oxford Illustrated History of Modern China, Chinese Characters, and My First Trip to China.

He attended the University of Florida, where he studied Asian Studies and Journalism Nieman Watchdog > About Us > Contributor > Ian Johnson. He obtained his master's degree in Sinology from the Free University of Berlin.

On February 9, 2006, Johnson delivered congressional testimony on the Muslim Brotherhood in Europe. He described the Brotherhood as "an umbrella group that regularly lobbies major international institutions like the EU and the Vatican" and "controls some of the most dynamic, politically active Muslim groups in key European countries, such as Britain, France and Germany." He said the group has schools "to train imams," has funded a "mechanism in the guise of a UK-registered charity," and has a fatwa council to enforce ideological conformity.

Johnson left the Wall Street Journal in 2010 to pursue magazine and book writing on cultural and social affairs.

Bibliography

Books

Essays and reporting
Ex-Colony Weihai Ponders What Might Have Been, Wall Street Journal, June 24, 1997
Can't We All Just Get Along? Are European Muslims Islam's best hope?, Wall Street Journal, September 16, 2004
In China, Grass-Roots Groups Stretch Limits on Activism, Wall Street Journal, January 9, 2008
"Will the Chinese be supreme?", New York Review of Books, 04.04.2013 Will the Chinese Be Supreme?
 Profile of Hengdian World Studios.

 Ian Johnson, "What Holds China Together?", The New York Review of Books, vol. LXVI, no. 14 (26 September 2019), pp. 14, 16, 18. "The Manchus... had [in 1644] conquered the last ethnic Chinese empire, the Ming [and established Imperial China's last dynasty, the Qing]... The Manchus expanded the empire's borders northward to include all of Mongolia, and westward to Tibet and Xinjiang." [p. 16.] "China's rulers have no faith that anything but force can keep this sprawling country intact." [p. 18.]

References

External links
Ian Johnson (2001) Pulitzer Prize winning articles in the Wall Street Journal
 Ian Johnson (website)
 
Language Wars, from Montreal to Beijing
 . YouTube. 

Pulitzer Prize for International Reporting winners
Canadian journalists
American male journalists
Living people
The New Yorker people
Nieman Fellows
University of Florida alumni
1962 births